This is a guide to the size of the wards in Rugby borough.

2001
This is based on the data from the 2001 UK Census. The entire population of the borough was 87,367.

2016
This is based on UK National Statistics estimates of districts and wards as of December 2016. The total population of the borough was estimated at 103,815.

 
N.B. Ward populations will differ from the village population which they are named after and which they are linked to as ward boundaries very rarely match village boundaries exactly.

References

Wards
Rugby borough, wards
Rugby